Rhode Island's Future is a Rhode Island blog dubbed the "state's most popular political blog" by the Phoenix Newspaper.

The blog was started in March 2005
by political activist Matthew Jerzyk, a long-time community and union organizer with SEIU and Jobs with Justice.  Contributing to this was the first Green Party elected official in Rhode Island's history (who later became a Democrat), State Representative David Segal.

Rhode Island's Future played a key role in the 2006 Senate race between Sheldon Whitehouse and Lincoln Chafee by exposing a scandal involving a Chafee staffer sending controversial emails from a government computer just one week before the election.  Jerzyk, the blog's editor, also played a central role in a prominent controversy at Roger Williams University School of Law involving the chairman of the university's board of trustees use of the "N-word" and the subsequent removal of his name from the law school.

Edited by Bob Plain, the site features as contributors:
 Steve Ahlquist
 Samuel G. Howard
 Tom Sgouros
 Andrew Stewart
 Brian Hull
 Samuel Bell
 Dave Fisher
 Frymaster
 Peter Nightingale
 Elisha Aldrich
 Bruce Reilly
 transportprovidence
 Mark Binder
 Russ Conway

External links
http://www.rifuture.org

References

American blogs
Internet properties established in 2005